Valgunde Parish is an administrative unit of Jelgava Municipality in the Semigallia region of Latvia.

Towns, villages and settlements of Valgunde Parish
  – parish administrative center

References 

Parishes of Latvia
Jelgava Municipality
Semigallia